Some famous ciphertexts (or cryptograms), in chronological order by date, are:

See also
 Undeciphered writing systems (cleartext, natural-language writing of unknown meaning)

External links
 Elonka Dunin's list of famous unsolved codes and ciphers

Cryptography lists and comparisons
History of cryptography
Undeciphered historical codes and ciphers